Carabus scabrosus, common name huge violet ground beetle, is a species of beetles of the family Carabidae.

Description

This is among the largest of the known Carabus beetles. The basic colour varies from bluish black to violet or dark reddish brown. The thorax is broad, truncated anteriorly and posteriorly, very slightly convex. The elytrtra are oval, convex and covered throughout with small tubercles. Also the pronotum has a rugose, granular surface.

Subspecies

 Carabus scabrosus akbesianus Breuning, 1975
 Carabus scabrosus amasicus Csiki, 1927
 Carabus scabrosus armenius Zaitzev, 1930
 Carabus scabrosus audouini Brullé, 1835
 Carabus scabrosus bakurianicola Rataj, 2018
 Carabus scabrosus bureschianus Breuning, 1928
 Carabus scabrosus callipygius Cavazzuti, 1986
 Carabus scabrosus caucasicus Adams, 1817
 Carabus scabrosus colchicus Motschulsky, 1844
 Carabus scabrosus culminicola (Cavazzuti, 1989)
 Carabus scabrosus dardanellicus Kraatz, 1886
 Carabus scabrosus demiddelaerae Rataj, 2018
 Carabus scabrosus elbursianus Mandl, 1958
 Carabus scabrosus estegeicus (Cavazzuti, 1989)
 Carabus scabrosus fallettianus (Cavazzuti, 1997)
 Carabus scabrosus farnazae Deuve, 2006 
 Carabus scabrosus ispiratus Cavazzuti, 1986
 Carabus scabrosus mentor Blumenthal & Breuning, 1967
 Carabus scabrosus montisabanti Schweiger, 1962
 Carabus scabrosus munzurensis Cavazzuti & Lassalle, 1987
 Carabus scabrosus propinquus Csiki, 1927
 Carabus scabrosus scabrosus Olivier, 1795
 Carabus scabrosus schuberti Breuning, 1968
 Carabus scabrosus sommeri Mannerheim, 1844
 Carabus scabrosus sterilis Bodemeyer, 1915
 Carabus scabrosus tauricus Bonelli, 1810
 Carabus scabrosus weidneri (Lassalle, 1990)

References
 Biolib
 Fauna europaea
 The Penny Encyclopedia, vol. 6
 Zipcodezoo
 Volovnik, S. V., Suchkov S. I. The huge violet ground beettle (Carabus (Procerus) scabrosus crimeanus) (Coleoptera: Carabidae) was found outside of the Crimea  // Journal of Insect Biodiversity, 2018, 8 (3): 52–56.

External links
 Beetles of Russia
 Galerie-insecte
 
 

scabrosus
Beetles described in 1795